Joe Anthony Walsh (born 1 April 2002) is an English professional footballer who plays as a goalkeeper for Maidenhead United  on loan from Queens Park Rangers.

Career

Gillingham
From Medway, Kent, Walsh joined local club Gillingham aged 11, signing a scholarship with the club in late 2017. In May 2019, Walsh signed a professional contract with Gillingham. On 3 September 2019, Walsh made his debut for Gillingham in a 3–2 EFL Trophy defeat against Colchester United.  He made his English Football League debut on 27 October 2020 when he came on as a substitute for the injured Jack Bonham against Ipswich Town.

Queens Park Rangers
On 28 January 2021, Walsh joined Queens Park Rangers for an undisclosed fee, signing a three and a half-year contract that would initially see him join up with the club's under-23s team.

On 16 September 2022, Walsh signed for National League South club Hampton & Richmond Borough on a one-month loan deal. On 17 November 2022, Walsh joined National League club Dorking Wanderers on loan until 7 January 2023. In February 2023 he joined Maidenhead United on loan until the end of the season.

Career statistics

References

2002 births
Living people
People from Medway
Footballers from Kent
Association football goalkeepers
English footballers
Gillingham F.C. players
Queens Park Rangers F.C. players
Hampton & Richmond Borough F.C. players
Dorking Wanderers F.C. players
Maidenhead United F.C. players
English Football League players
National League (English football) players